"The Louse and the Flea" or "Little Louse and Little Flea" is a German fairy tale collected by the Brothers Grimm, number 30.

It is Aarne-Thompson type 2022, An Animal Mourns the Death of a Spouse, and takes the form of a chain tale, sometimes known as a cumulative tale. Wilhelm Grimm probably heard the story from Dorothea Catharina Wild in 1808.

Synopsis
A louse and a flea are married until the louse drowns while brewing.  The flea mourns, inspiring a door to ask why and start creaking, which inspires a broom to ask why and start sweeping -- through a sequence of objects until a spring overflows at the news and drowns them all.

Variants
In some versions the louse and the flea are replaced by a ladybird and a fly.

References

External links
 "Mourning the Death of a Spouse:chain tales of Aarne-Thompson type 2022" by D. L. Ashliman

Louse and the Flea
Louse and the Flea
Louse and the Flea
ATU 2000-2199